The High Cost of Living is a 2010 indie drama film starring Zach Braff, Isabelle Blais and Aimee Lee. Written and directed by Deborah Chow and set in Montreal, the film centers on a young, pregnant woman whose world falls apart when she loses her child in a hit and run accident due to her drug abuse and negligence.

The film made its debut at the 2010 Toronto International Film Festival, and was released theatrically in April 2011. It won TIFF's award for Best Canadian First Feature Film.

Plot
Nathalie (Isabelle Blais) watches her life unravel after she loses her pregnancy due to a hit and run accident. She finds an unlikely protector in Henry (Zach Braff), a down and out guardian angel who has followed her thread. But Henry is not quite an angel, and she struggles to come to terms with the loss.
Nathalie begins to rely on Henry, and even begins to love him. It becomes clear to Nathalie that he is a drug dealer, and she accepts this but tells him he should change his ways.
Later, as Nathalie and the police are trying to find the man that hit her, it is revealed to be Henry. He then goes to her telling he will turn himself in because that is all he can give her since she cannot forgive him. To prove that he will he calls the detective and leaves his number. Earlier in the movie she asked him if he would accompany her when she gives birth to her stillborn, in the end he still goes. After the OR doors shut on him, the police return his call.

Cast
 Zach Braff as Henry Welles
 Isabelle Blais as Nathalie
 Patrick Labbe as Michael
 Julian Lo as Johnny
 Kyle Switzer as Eli

Reception
On Rotten Tomatoes the film has an approval rating of 53% based on reviews from 15 critics, with an average rating of 5.5/10. On Metacritic, the film has a weighted average score of 49 out of 100, based on 6 critics, indicating "mixed or average reviews".

The New York Times wrote: This film bears all the hallmarks of a conventional indie drama: "a downbeat scenario, flawed protagonists, and a strongly regional inflection." Chow is credited on hitting every mark and narrative turning point. The result is a strange dramatic complexity, with a work of superficial depth.

References

External links
 
 

2010 films
Canadian drama films
English-language Canadian films
Films shot in Montreal
Films set in Montreal
Films directed by Deborah Chow
Films scored by Normand Corbeil
2010 directorial debut films
French-language Canadian films
2010s Canadian films